Yugoslavia competed at the 1991 Mediterranean Games held in Athens, Greece. This was the country's last appearance before the breakup of Yugoslavia.

Medalists

References

 Yugoslavia at the 1991 Mediterranean Games - Serbian Olympic Committee

Nations at the 1991 Mediterranean Games
1991
Mediterranean Games